Cousinia annua is a species of flowering plant in the family Asteraceae. It is native to Central Asia; Kazakhstan, Turkmenistan, and Uzbekistan.

References

Cynareae
Flora of Central Asia